The 2012–13 daytime network television schedule for four of the five major English-language commercial broadcast networks in the United States covers the weekday daytime hours from September 2012 to August 2013. The schedule is followed by a list per network of returning series, and any series canceled after the 2011–12 season.

Affiliates fill time periods not occupied by network programs with local or syndicated programming. PBS – which offers daytime programming through a children's program block, PBS Kids – is not included, as its member television stations have local flexibility over most of their schedules and broadcast times for network shows may vary. Also not included are stations affiliated with Fox (as the network does not air a daytime network schedule or network news), MyNetworkTV (as the programming service also does not offer daytime programs of any kind), and Ion Television (as its schedule is composed mainly of syndicated reruns).

Legend

 New series are highlighted in bold.

Schedule
 All times correspond to U.S. Eastern and Pacific Time scheduling (except for some live sports or events). Except where affiliates slot certain programs outside their network-dictated timeslots, subtract one hour for Central, Mountain, Alaska, and Hawaii-Aleutian times.
 Local schedules may differ, as affiliates have the option to pre-empt or delay network programs. Such scheduling may be limited to preemptions caused by local or national breaking news or weather coverage (which may force stations to tape delay certain programs in overnight timeslots or defer them to a co-operated station or digital subchannel in their regular timeslot) and any major sports events scheduled to air in a weekday timeslot (mainly during major holidays). Stations may air shows at other times at their preference.

Monday-Friday

 Note: On September 10, 2012, ABC moved General Hospital to 2:00 p.m. ET (a move done partly to accommodate the addition of the syndicated talk show Katie), and turned over the 3:00 p.m. ET hour to its owned-and-operated stations and affiliates.

Saturday

Sunday

By network

ABC

Returning series:
ABC World News with Diane Sawyer
The Chew
General Hospital
Good Morning America
The View
This Week with George Stephanopoluos
  Litton's Weekend Adventure
Jack Hanna's Wild Countdown
Ocean Mysteries with Jeff Corwin
Born to Explore with Richard Wiese
Sea Rescue
Food for Thought with Claire Thomas

New series:
Litton's Weekend Adventure
Recipe Rehab

Not returning from 2011–12:
Good Afternoon America
One Life to Live
The Revolution
Litton's Weekend Adventure
Culture Click
Everyday Health

CBS

Returning series:
The Bold and the Beautiful
CBS Evening News
CBS News Sunday Morning
CBS This Morning
Face the Nation
Let's Make a Deal
The Price Is Right
The Talk
The Young and the Restless
 Cookie Jar TV
Busytown Mysteries
The Doodlebops

New series:
Cookie Jar TV
Liberty’s Kids

Not returning from 2011-12
The Early Show
Cookie Jar TV
Danger Rangers
Horseland

The CW

New series:
The Bill Cunningham Show 
Vortexx
Power Rangers Lost Galaxy
Iron Man: Armored Adventures
Justice League Unlimited
WWE Saturday Morning Slam
Transformers: Prime
The New Adventures of Nanoboy
The Adventures of Chuck and Friends
B-Daman Crossfire
Bolts and Blip
The Spectacular Spider-Man

Returning series:
Yu-Gi-Oh!
Yu-Gi-Oh! Zexal
Rescue Heroes
Dragon Ball Z Kai
Cubix: Robots for Everyone
Sonic X

Not returning from 2011–12:
Dr. Drew's Lifechangers
Toonzai
Tai Chi Chasers
Magi-Nation
Yu-Gi-Oh! Capsule Monsters

FOX

Returning series:
Fox News Sunday
Fox Sports
Fox NFL
Fox NFL Sunday
MLB Player Poll
Weekend Marketplace

NBC

Returning series:
Days of Our Lives
Meet the Press
NBC Nightly News with Brian Williams
Today
 NBC Kids
Noodle and Doodle
Pajanimals
Poppy Cat
Justin Time
LazyTown
The Wiggles

New series:
NBC Kids
The Chica Show
Tree Fu Tom

Not returning from 2011-12:
Qubo (continues on Ion Television)
Turbo Dogs
Shelldon
The Magic School Bus (reruns)
Babar (reruns)
Willa's Wild Life
Pearlie
The Zula Patrol
Jane and the Dragon (reruns)

See also
2012–13 United States network television schedule (prime-time)
2012–13 United States network television schedule (late night)

References

Sources
 
 
 

United States weekday network television schedules
2012 in American television
2013 in American television